On the Mysteries of the Egyptians, Chaldeans, and Assyrians, also known as the Theurgia and under its abbreviated Latin title De Mysteriis Aegyptiorum (The Egyptian Mysteries; or often simply De Mysteriis), is a work of Neoplatonic philosophy primarily concerned with ritual and theurgy and attributed to Iamblichus.

Porphyry is known to have had a disagreement with Iamblichus over the practice of theurgy, and the Mysteries consists mainly of Iamblichus' responses to the criticisms of his teacher.

Authorship
Proclus, writing 100 years after Iamblichus, seems to have ascribed to him the authorship of the Mysteries. However, the differences between this book and Iamblichus' other works in style and in some points of doctrine have led some to question whether Iamblichus was the actual author. Still, the treatise certainly originated from his school, and in its systematic attempt to give a speculative justification of the polytheistic cult practices of the day, it marks a turning-point in the history of thought where Iamblichus stood.

Contents
There are 10 books in the work, of which the longest are Books 1 and 3. The contents of the books are.

Book I: The soul and the gods
Book II: Epiphanies
Book III: Mantic ritual
Book IV: Justice
Book V: The nature of sacrifice
Book VI: The process and effects of sacrifice
Book VII: Egyptian symbolism
Book VIII: Egyptian theology
Book IX: The personal daemon (spirit)
Book X: Conclusion

See also
John M. Dillon
Chaldean Oracles
Enneads

Bibliography

References

External links
 On the Egyptian Mysteries, translated by Thomas Taylor, 1821
 On the Egyptian Mysteries, translated by Alexander Wilder, 1911
 De mysteriis Aegyptiorum, Venice: Aldus Manutius, 1497

Neoplatonic texts
Late Antique literature
Ancient Greeks in Egypt
Roman Egypt